The following is a list of episodes for the UPN comedy-drama series Moesha. The series premiered on January 23, 1996, and aired a total of 127 episodes during its six-season run. Moesha's final episode aired on May 14, 2001. The pilot episode was filmed in late April 1995, while filming for the first season began in October 1995.

Series overview

Episodes

Season 1 (1996)

Season 2 (1996–97)
 Fredro Starr joins the cast.
 Shar Jackson joins the main cast.

Season 3 (1997–98)

Season 4 (1998–99)
 Fredro Starr is no longer part of the main cast. Although he makes a guest appearance in one episode. 
 Jon Huertas joined the season in a recurring role.
 This is Countess Vaughn's last season of the show.
 The opening theme song received a complete overhaul which remained for the rest of the series’ run.

Season 5 (1999–2000)
 Ray J. Norwood joins the cast as a Series regular
 Countess Vaughn is no longer part of the main cast.
 This is Yvette Wilson's last season of the show.
 Fredro Starr makes a guest appearance in two episodes.
 This is Sheryl Lee Ralph's last season as part of the main cast.

Season 6 (2000–01)
 Yvette Wilson and Sheryl Lee Ralph are no longer part of the main cast.
 Sheryl Lee Ralph makes a recurring appearance in seven episodes.
 Fredro Starr makes a guest appearance in two episodes.

References

External links
 

Lists of American sitcom episodes